is a third-person puzzle-action video game that was published and developed by Namco for the PlayStation 2 video game console. The success of the game led to the release of six sequels in Japan and other territories: We Love Katamari, Me & My Katamari, Beautiful Katamari, Katamari Damacy Mobile, I Love Katamari, and Katamari Forever. It also inspired a spin-off game, Korogashi Puzzle Katamari Damacy.

Five of the games' soundtracks have been released as albums. Katamari Fortissimo Damacy, a soundtrack album for the original game, was released by Columbia Music Entertainment in 2004, Katamari wa Damacy was released as a soundtrack album for We Love Katamari by Columbia Music Entertainment in 2005, and Katamari Original Soundtrack Damacy was released in 2006 as a soundtrack album for Me & My Katamari by the same publisher and also included tracks from We Love that were not included in its album. Katamari Suteki Damacy was released by Columbia Music Entertainment in 2007 as a soundtrack album for Beautiful Katamari, and the latest album, Katamari Damacy Tribute Original Soundtrack: Katamari Takeshi, was released in 2009 by Columbia Music Entertainment as the soundtrack album for Katamari Forever. The soundtracks to the other Katamari games have been composed of tracks from previous games in the series, and have not had separate album releases.

Both the soundtracks and their associated albums have been well received by reviewers, who have cited the "catchiness" and "quirkiness" of the music as their most notable features. The soundtrack to Katamari Damacy won both IGN's and GameSpot's "Soundtrack of the Year 2004" awards, while the theme song to We Love Katamari was awarded Best Original Vocal/Pop Song at the 4th Annual Game Audio Network Guild awards in 2006. None of the other soundtracks have been nominated for any awards. They were still well received by reviewers, with the music of the PlayStation Portable game Me & My Katamari receiving the weakest reviews due to its extensive reuse of songs from previous games in the series.

Katamari Damacy

Katamari Damacy is a third-person puzzle-action video game that was published and developed by Namco for the PlayStation 2 in 2004. The music in the game was widely hailed as imaginative and original and was considered one of its top-selling points. Its eclectic composition featured elements of traditional electronic video game music, as well as heavy jazz and samba influences. The tracks were composed by multiple composers, with Yuu Miyake composing the most at seven and acting as the sound director; other composers for the game were Asuka Sakai, Akitaka Tohyama, Yoshihito Yano, Yuri Misumi, and Hideki Tobeta. Many of the tracks feature vocals from popular J-pop singers such as Yui Asaka and anime voice actors such as Nobue Matsubara and Ado Mizumori. Miyake wanted to use vocal songs because he felt that they were necessary "to make music that only Katamari Damacy could do, really fun music". He has said that game director Keita Takahashi did not give detailed directions on the sound design of the game, allowing Miyake and his team to instead create whatever they felt would fit best.

The artists were chosen after the lyrics were written, and were selected based on how well Miyake and Takahashi felt they would "gel with the world of Katamari Damacy and the content of the song lyrics". They were also chosen to create a "pretty silly, goofy selection of singers" that would appeal to "a broad spectrum of people from different generations". Once the lyrics and singers had been chosen, the music was written specifically for each artist with the intention of creating songs that were "familiar" but not "trendy" so that they would not seem dated in the future. The "humming" in the opening song, described by Miyake as "na-na-na-na-na-na-na-Katamari", was included as an experiment by Miyake to try to create a "memorable" theme associated with the game, in response to criticisms that modern game music was not as memorable as that of older games. Miyake says that "Cherry Tree Times" is his favorite piece from the series.

 is the soundtrack album to the game. It includes all of the tracks featured in the game, as well as an additional track, "Katamari March Damacy", a bonus song that was not included in the game. The album has 21 tracks that span a duration of 1:15:13. It was released on May 19, 2004, by Columbia Music Entertainment with the catalog number COCX-32760.

The soundtrack to Katamari Damacy won both IGN's and GameSpot's "Soundtrack of the Year 2004" awards. It was also nominated for "Outstanding Achievement in Original Musical Composition" at the 8th annual Interactive Achievement Awards in February 2005. In GameSpot's review of the game, they described the soundtrack as based around a "singular, extremely catchy theme" that appeared as pop, jazz, and humming throughout the "insidiously infectious" music. IGN's review of the game said that "not since Mario created its everlasting tune have we heard tracks so catchy and so genuine". The soundtrack album was praised in a review by Square Enix Music Online, who said that in addition to the music being "outside the box", the soundtrack "fits with the graphics and gameplay in every way possible", is "extremely pleasing to the ears", and "could very well be a great album with no game attached".  He described the music as "fun", "catchy", and "quirky" and highly recommended the album. The album reached #191 on the Japanese Oricon charts.

We Love Katamari

, is the sequel to Katamari Damacy published by Namco for the PlayStation 2 in 2005. It features music from Namco composers Yuu Miyake, Akitaka Tohyama, Asuka Sakai, Hideki Tobeta, and Katsuro Tajima, all of whom except for Tajima had composed for the previous soundtrack. Like the previous soundtrack, it also features a plethora of Japanese artists, including DOKAKA, Illreme, Arisa, KIRINJI, YOU, Karie Kahimi, Maki Nomiya and Shigeru Matsuzaki. The music has been described as covering styles ranging from swing and techno to J-pop and "other kooky sounds". Sound director Yuu Miyake has stated that he wanted to use only non-Japanese musicians in contrast to the first game using only Japanese artists, but was unable due to a "lack of foreign friends and ability to negotiate". He has stated that his goal for the soundtrack was to take what his team had done for the first game and raise the quality, creating a "more grown-up feeling". He originally wanted to additionally take the music "far beyond imagination" and fans' expectations, but was stymied by a lack of resources.

 is the official soundtrack album for the game. It does not include all the music from the game, omitting many of the instrumental tracks heard throughout the game. These omissions were later added on the second disc of the soundtrack album of Me & My Katamari. The album was published by Columbia Music Entertainment on July 20, 2005 with the catalog number COCX-33273; its 18 tracks span a duration of 1:19:45.

We Love Katamari was nominated for the "best audio" award at the 2005 British Academy of Film and Television Arts awards. While the soundtrack as a whole did not win any awards like its predecessor, "Katamari on the Swing" won the award for Best Original Vocal/Pop Song at the 4th Annual Game Audio Network Guild awards in 2006. The album reached #100 on the Japanese Oricon charts. GameSpot's review of the game termed the music "utterly avant-garde" and a "completely off-the-wall soundtrack that has the same key themes as the first game", though "decidedly less focused on catchiness" than that of the first game and more "experimental". Square Enix Music Online, in their review of the soundtrack album, said that it "pretty much lives up to the original's reputation" and is full of "lots of great original compositions that fit with the concept". While they said that the soundtrack has "more flaws and it's a bit less memorable" than the soundtrack to Katamari Damacy, it was still "just as fun and as quirky as the last".

Me & My Katamari

 is the third game in the series, and was released on the PlayStation Portable by Namco in 2005. Its soundtrack was primarily composed of tracks from the previous two games, and has been described as "ranging from smoky lounge music to bleepy Japanese pop songs". The new tracks were composed by Yuu Miyake, Yuri Misawa, Hideki Tobeta, Yoshihito Yano, Akitaka Tohyama, and Naoki Tohyama; Misawa and Tohyama were new composers to the series, while Miyake reprised his role from the previous two games as sound director.

 is the soundtrack album for the game. In addition to the new tracks, it includes previously unreleased tracks from We Love Katamari as tracks 10–17 on the first disc. Its second disc is made up of orchestral arrangements of previous tracks, tracks from other Namco games, three ambient noise tracks, two taiko drum tracks, and one a cappella track. The album was released by Columbia Music Entertainment on December 26, 2005 with the catalog numbers COCX-33517~8. Its 37 tracks have a total length of 1:48:55.

In their review of the game, GameSpot called the music "catchy and eclectic", though they disapproved of the number of reused tracks from previous Katamari games. IGN was more ambivalent, saying that while they had no complaints about the music, they also saw "nothing to really praise either". Square Enix Music Online, in their review of the album, said that the album's "lack of humorous vocal tracks and high quality experimental instrumentals" meant that it did not match up to the previous soundtracks in the series. They additionally felt that the second disc did not add much to the album, and that on the whole the new Me & My Katamari tracks were not strong or numerous enough to make the purchase worthwhile. Unlike the previous two soundtracks in the series, the soundtrack to Me & My Katamari did not win any awards.

Track list

Beautiful Katamari

, is a video game produced by Namco Bandai for the Xbox 360 in 2007. Like previous games in the series, its music was composed by a large number of composers: Yuri Misumi, Yuu Miyake, Akitaka Tohyama, and Yoshihito Yano returned as previous composers for the series, and were joined by Rio Hamamoto, Yuji Masubuchi, Keiichi Okabe, Hiroto Sasaki, Tetsuya Uchida, and Ryo Watanabe. Yuu Miyake did not reprise his role as sound director for the game; this role was instead filled by Tetsuya Uchida. The music for Beautiful Katamari has been described as "the same sort of mix of J-pop, techno-infused jazz, and ambient electro" as that of the original game. Unlike Me & My Katamari, the majority of the music for the game was original, though a few tracks from earlier in the series were remixed.

 is the soundtrack album for the game. The album has 17 tracks and has a length of 1:10:04; it was published by Columbia Music Entertainment on November 21, 2007 with the catalog number COCX-34602.

GameSpot, in their review of the game, termed the music "one of the quirkiest and most oddly listenable soundtracks in gaming", and said that it fit the mood of the game as well as the soundtrack to the first two games. Square Enix Music Online, in their review of the soundtrack album, said that while it had "a lot of original worth", that it was not any better than the first two soundtrack albums of the series and instead came across as more of the same. They termed the album overall as a "bit underwhelming" and marred by a few "dud" tracks. The album reached #253 on the Japanese Oricon charts.

Katamari Forever

The music for the game includes a number of remixed tracks from previous iterations of the series, using a combination of "electric" and "organic" sounds according to the sound director Yuu Miyake. Miyake employed the help of over 20 other Japanese artists and remixers to help the soundtrack, which was designed to act as part of a "musical trilogy" with the soundtrack to Katamari Damacy and We Love Katamari. This was accomplished by choosing tracks from those games that were either fan or staff favorites and having them remixed by both Japanese and non-Japanese artists, though Miyake notes that the majority of the artists were Japanese as he did not know many non-Japanese musicians, the same problem that kept non-Japanese artists out of the first two soundtracks of the "trilogy". Miyake has stated that focusing so much on using music from earlier in the series made it very challenging to still allow each artist to explore their creativity, and does not intend to repeat this strategy if a new game is ever made.

 is the soundtrack album for the game. It was released on August 19, 2009 by Columbia Music Entertainment with the catalog numbers COCX-35745~6. Its 36 tracks on two discs span a duration of 2:38:21. The musical styles used in the soundtrack have been described as an "eclectic mix of sunny J-pop, throbbing dance music, jolly jazz, and more".

GameSpot, in their review of the game, said that Katamari Forever "carries on the series' tradition of wildly catchy soundtracks" and said that the remixes of the older songs "sound terrific". PALGN concurred, calling it a "great soundtrack". The album was received warmly by reviewers such as Square Enix Music Online, who said that it was full of "fresh, diverse, and often downright weird remixes". Describing it as much more of a spiritual successor to the original game's soundtrack than the prior sequels, they said that it kept the "upbeat, humorous, and sentimental feel" of the songs in the original while taking them in new directions. The album reached #158 on the Japanese Oricon charts.

Touch My Katamari

As has become commonplace for the series, its music was composed by a large number of composers: a large team headed by Taku Inoue included series veteran Yuu Miyake, Ken Inaoka, BAKUBAKU DOKIN, Akitaka Tohyama, Hiroyuki Kawada, Yoshihito Yano, Yuichi Nakamura, Hiroshi Okubo, and Trine. The music includes both original pieces as well as many remixes of pieces from prior games, such as a new version of "Lonely Rolling Star". Inoue was charged by Miyake with making the music of the game "newer and fresher", as Miyake was tired of the series repeating the same concepts, and Inoue attempted to impart his own style into the original pieces and to use new styles of arrangements.

The music was released in several forms. First, as a soundtrack album, Katamari Damacy Novita Original Soundtrack: Katamori Damacy (塊魂ノ･ビ～タ オリジナルサウンドトラック 「かたもりだましい」), which contains 16 tracks and has a length of 1:12:12. It was published by Columbia Music Entertainment on December 21, 2011 with the catalog number COCX-37131. An additional two digital-only publications of songs from the game, titled Kamatari Damacy - Touch My Katamari Original Sound Track 2 and Katamari Aventur Damacy - Touch My Katamari Original Sound Track 3, were released on April 10, 2012 and November 20, 2012, with eleven and three songs and lengths of 33:01 and 10:10, respectively.

Christopher Huynh of Video Game Music Online (formerly Square Enix Music Online), in their review of Katamori Damacy, felt that the soundtrack had the energy of the first few soundtracks in the series, while providing a more cohesive experience by not including "filler" tracks like previous albums.

References

Katamari
Katamari Damacy series